Vice-Chancellor or vice chancellor  may mean:
Vice-chancellor (education), the chief executive of a British or Commonwealth university (also used in some American universities)
Vice-Chancellor of the Holy Roman Church, a former papal office
Chancellor of the High Court of Justice of England and Wales, a British judicial position, formerly known as the Vice-Chancellor
Vice-chancellor, a judge of the Delaware Court of Chancery in the United States
Vice-Chancellor of Austria, the deputy head of government of Austria
Vice-Chancellor of Germany, the deputy head of government of Germany
Swiss Vice-Chancellor, one of two senior deputies to the Swiss Federal Chancellor
Generally, somebody whose duties are to assist a chancellor

See also
Chancellor (disambiguation)